The discography of Swedish-born Greek singer Helena Paparizou consists of ten studio albums (seven in Greek and three in English, including the "My Number One" edition in Europe), three compilation albums, sixteen extended plays, seventy-seven singles (including seventeen as a featured artist), four video albums, sixty-two music videos and she has participated in three soundtracks. Helena Paparizou was awarded several times by the Greek IFPI for selling more than 300,000 albums in her solo career and, besides, having sold a total of 100,000 CD singles.

Paparizou made her solo debut career in December 2003 with the single "Anapandites Kliseis", which peaked at number one in Greece, where it was subsequently certified gold. In 2005, she represented Greece in the  Eurovision Song Contest with the song "My Number One", which she won. It is the first Greek win in the contest's history and transformed her career. Her first album Protereotita was subsequently certified double platinum by the International Federation of the Phonographic Industry of Greece. Paparizou's  first international album was released in the summer of the same year, after the start of her collaboration with the Sony Music globaly. The international singles "My Number One", " Mambo!" and " Heroes", achieved worldwide recognition. The first of these singles reaching number eight on the US Billboard's Dance Club Songs, and the other two singles reaching on the US Billboard's Eurochart Hot 100 list.

Her three subsequent albums Iparhi Logos (2006),  The Game of Love (2006) and Vrisko To Logo Na Zo (2008), all peaked at number one in Greece and reached platinum sales. Her fifth studio album Giro Apo T' Oneiro (2010) was also certified platinum in physical stores, but also went eleven times platinum with record sales from a newspaper. Paparizou's final release before she left Sony Music,  Greatest Hits & More (2011), was her first compilation album and included "Baby It's Over", her biggest hit until 2016. 

From 2013 she had signed a multi-territory deal with  Universal Music, which has exclusive agreements with labels across the Universal Music Group, including Minos EMI in Greece and  Capitol Music in Sweden. Since then he has released various albums Ti Ora Tha Vgoume? (2013),  One Life (2014) and  Ouranio Toxo (2017) with her biggest hit to date "An Me Dis Na Kleo", which has gained over 30 million views on YouTube. Ouranio Toxo was certified platinum in Greece. Her tenth studio album, Apohrosis (2021), has a music video in every song and Paparizou did the production on it.

Paparizou is one of the most successfull singers in Europe with high sales in the music industry and numerous awards, especially in Greece, in Cyprus and in Sweden. In 2010, Forbes listed Paparizou as the 21st most powerful and influential celebrity in Greece.

Studio albums

Compilation albums

Soundtrack albums

Others

Extended plays and CD singles

Singles

As lead artist

As featured artist

Promotional singles

Music videos

DVD releases
 2005 – Number One
 2006 – Mad Secret Concerts
 2008 – Live in Concert
 2010 – Giro Apo T' Oneiro The Deluxe Edition

Notes

A. ^ Though there are enough copies of the album in circulation to normally warrant a music sales certification, IFPI Greece does not award certifications for albums released as bonuses with newspapers and magazines.

References

External links
Elena Paparizou's official website
IFPI Greece official website with Greek charts

Discography
Discographies of Greek artists
Pop music discographies